Izumi Station is the name of multiple train stations in Japan.

 Izumi Station (Kagoshima) (出水駅)
 Izumi Station (Iwaki) (泉駅) - in Iwaki, Fukushima Prefecture
 Izumi Station (Fukushima) (泉駅) - in Fukushima, Fukushima Prefecture